Michał Przysiężny was the defending champion, but decided not to participate.
Marius Copil won this tournament, by defeating 4th seed Andreas Beck 6–4, 6–4 in the final.

Seeds

Draw

Finals

Top half

Bottom half

References
 Main Draw
 Qualifying Draw

2011 ATP Challenger Tour
2011 Singles
2011 in Russian tennis